Sergei Vadimovich Matsenko (born 21 June 1990) is a Russian chess grandmaster.

Chess career
Born in 1990, Matsenko earned his international master title in 2007 and his grandmaster title in 2018. He is the No. 70 ranked Russian player as of May 2018.

In 2019, he won the Saint Louis Invitational – GM Norm tied with Titas Stremavičius.

Personal life
Matsenko was born in Chelyabinsk, and holds two bachelor's degrees in law and engineering from South Ural State University. , he is studying for a master's degree in industrial engineering at Texas Tech University.

References

External links

Living people
1990 births
Chess grandmasters
Sportspeople from Chelyabinsk
Russian chess players